Cutting edge or The Cutting Edge may refer to:

The cutting surface of a blade or other cutting tool
State of the art, the highest level of development, as of a device, technique, or scientific field

Businesses
Cutting Edge Creations, an American inflatable-structures company
Cutting Edge Haunted House, a haunted house attraction in Fort Worth, Texas, U.S.

Film and television
Cutting Edge (TV series), a British documentary series on Channel 4
The Cutting Edge film franchise of romantic comedies centred on figure skating:
The Cutting Edge (1992), starring D. B. Sweeney and Moira Kelly
The Cutting Edge: Going for the Gold (2006), starring Christy Carlson Romano and Ross Thomas
The Cutting Edge: Chasing the Dream (2008), starring Matt Lanter, Francia Raisa and Christy Carlson Romano
The Cutting Edge: Fire and Ice (2010), starring Francia Raisa and Brendan Fehr
The Cutting Edge: The Magic of Movie Editing, a 2004 documentary film
I.R.S. Records Presents The Cutting Edge, a 1980s music TV series
"The Cutting Edge", an interview segment on the live TV show WWE Raw hosted by pro wrestler Edge
"Cutting Edge Peep Show" when hosted together by Edge and Christian

Music
Cutting Edge (band), a jazz-rock band from Norway
The Cutting Edge (album), a 1974 album by Sonny Rollins
Cutting Edge (recordings), a series of recordings by Delirious?
The Bootleg Series Vol. 12: The Cutting Edge 1965–1966, an album by Bob Dylan
Cutting Edge (record label), a Japanese record label, part of the Avex Group

Other uses
The Cutting Edge (novel), a novel by Dave Duncan in the Handful of Men series
The Cutting Edge (sculpture), a sculpture at Sheaf Square in Sheffield, England

See also
Bleeding edge technology
Leading edge (disambiguation)
Edge (disambiguation)